Venera-D is a proposed Russian space mission to Venus that would include an orbiter and a lander to be launched in 2029. The orbiter's prime objective is to perform observations with the use of a radar. The lander, based on the Venera design, would be capable of operating for a long duration (≈3 h) on the planet's surface. The "D" in Venera-D stands for "dolgozhivushaya," which means "long lasting" in Russian.

Venera-D will be the first Venus probe launched by the Russian Federation (the earlier Venera probes were launched by the former Soviet Union). Venera-D will serve as the flagship for a new generation of Russian-built Venus probes, culminating with a lander capable of withstanding the harsh Venusian environment for more than the 1 hours logged by the Soviet probes. The surface of Venus experiences average temperatures of 462° Celsius (864 Fahrenheit), crushing  pressures, and corroding clouds of carbon dioxide laced with sulfuric acid. Venera-D will be launched on an Angara A5 rocket.

History

In 2003, Venera-D was proposed to the Russian Academy of Sciences for its "wish list" of science projects to be included into the Federal Space Program in 2006–2015. During the formulation of the mission concept in 2004, the launch of Venera-D was expected in 2013 and its landing on the surface of Venus in 2014. In its original conception, it had a large orbiter, a sub-satellite, two balloons, two small landers, and a large long-lived lander (≈3 h).

By 2011, the mission had been pushed back to 2018, and scaled back to an orbiter with a subsatellite orbiter, and a single lander with an expected 3-hour operation time.  By the beginning of 2011, the Venera-D project entered Phase A (Preliminary Design) stage of development.

Following the loss of the Phobos-Grunt spacecraft in November 2011 and resulting delays in all Russian planetary projects (with the exception of ExoMars, a joint effort with the European Space Agency), the implementation of the project was again delayed to no earlier than 2026.

The possible detection of phosphine in Venus's atmosphere by ALMA in September 2020 spurred a renewed push to implement the Venera-D project. As of March 2021, Venera-D is planned for launch no earlier than November 2029.

Status 

Lavochkin Association are leading the effort in the development of the mission concept architecture. It may include instruments from NASA. From 2018 to 2020, the second phase of the science activities between NASA and the Russian Space Research Institute (IKI) will continue to refine the science concepts, the orbiter and lander mission architecture, as well as a detailed examination of the types of aerial platforms that could address key Venus science in situ. Additional workshops will be held as the mission concept develops. From the standpoint of total mass delivered to Venus, the best launch opportunities occur in 2029 and 2031.

Goals

The mission has an emphasis on the atmospheric superrotation, the geological processes that have formed and modified the surface, the mineralogical and elemental composition of surface materials, and the chemical processes related to the interaction of the surface and the atmosphere.

The orbiter's goals are
Study of the dynamics and nature of superrotation, radiative balance, and the nature of the greenhouse effect
Characterize the thermal structure of the atmosphere, winds, thermal tides, and solar locked structures
Measure the composition of the atmosphere, study the clouds, their structure, composition, microphysics, and chemistry
Investigate the upper atmosphere, ionosphere, electrical activity, magnetosphere, and the gas escape rate

The lander's goals are 
Perform chemical analysis of surface materials and study the elemental composition of the surface, including radiogenic elements
Study of interaction between the surface and the atmosphere
Investigate the structure and chemical composition of the atmosphere down to the surface, including the abundances and isotopic ratios of the trace and noble gases
Perform direct chemical analysis of the cloud aerosols
Characterize the geology of local landforms at different scales

Notional science instruments

To achieve the mission's science goals, the team is assessing the following instruments for the orbiter: 
PFS-VD Fourier transform spectrometer, 250–2000 cm-1 λ=5-45 μm, Δν = 1 cm-1
UV mapping spectrometer, 190–490 nm, Δʎ=0.3 nm
MM-radiometer, Millimeter Wave Radiometer; Ka, V and W bands
UV-IR Imaging Spectrometer, VENIS
Monitoring camera
Solar and star occultation spectrometer, SSOE
Infrared heterodyne spectrometer, IVOLGA
Radio-science 1 Orbiter to ground, two-frequency occultation in S- and X-bands
Radio-science 2 Ground to orbiter two-frequency occultation in S- and X-bands
GROZA-SAS2-DFM-D, Electromagnetic waves generated by lightning and other electric phenomena
 Suite of 3 plasma instruments: 1) Panoramic energy mass-analyzer of ions; 2) CAMERA-O, electron spectrometer ELSPEC, fast neutrals analyzer FNA; 3) Energetic particle spectrometer.

Lander instruments
The lander will carry about 85 kg of instruments, that may include:
Mossbauer Spectrometer / APXS
Chemical analyses package (CAP): Gas Chromatograph & Mass Spectrometer
Meteorological suite
Sample acquisition, handling, processing

Potential NASA collaboration

In 2014, Russian scientists asked NASA if the U.S. space agency would be interested in collaborating some instruments to the mission. Under this potential collaboration, the study team "Venera-D Joint Science Definition Team" (JSDT) was established in 2015. Venera-D could incorporate some US components, including balloons, a subsatellite for plasma measurements, or a long-lived (90-day) surface station on the lander. Any potential collaboration is still under discussion.

Potential science instruments NASA could contribute include a Raman spectrometer and an Alpha-Proton X-Ray Spectrometer (APXS). Also, the three types of atmospheric maneuverable platforms under consideration by NASA include super pressure balloons, altitude controlled balloons, the Venus Atmospheric Maneuverable Platform (VAMP) semi-buoyant aircraft, and solar powered aircraft.

The solar-powered Venus Atmosphere Mobile Platform (VAMP) is currently under development by the Northrop-Grumman Corp. If included, it would be capable of flying within the cloud layer between 50 and 62 km, and is being developed to operate over the 117 Earth days needed for complete monitoring over one full Venus day. It would carry instruments to acquire observations of the atmospheric structure, circulation, radiation, composition and trace gas species, along with cloud aerosols and the unknown ultraviolet absorber(s).

Another proposed payload is LLISSE (Long Lived In-situ Solar System Explorer), which uses new materials and heat-resistant electronics that would enable independent operation for about 90 Earth days. This endurance may allow to obtain periodic measurements of weather data to update global circulation models and quantify near surface atmospheric chemistry variability. Its anticipated instruments include wind speed/direction sensors, temperature sensors, pressure sensors, and a chemical multi-sensor array. The lander may carry two LLISSE units; one would be battery-powered (3,000 h), and the other would be wind-powered.

As a result of US sanctions imposed as a result of the 2022 Russian invasion of Ukraine, Roscosmos Director-General Dmitry Rogozin announced that any continued participation between Russia and the United States on Venera-D was inappropriate.

See also
 
 List of missions to Venus
 VERITAS, orbiter
 DAVINCI+, orbiter and atmospheric probe
 EnVision, ESA orbiter

References

External links
Venera-D – Federal Space program of Russian Federation
Venera-D mission at Russia Space Web
 Venera-D Phase II Report (31 January 2019)

Russian space probes
Missions to Venus
Proposed space probes
2029 in spaceflight
2020s in Russia